Bargaining power is the relative ability of parties in an argumentative situation (such as bargaining, contract writing, or making an agreement) to exert influence over each other. If both parties are on an equal footing in a debate, then they will have equal bargaining power, such as in a perfectly competitive market, or between an evenly matched monopoly and monopsony.

There are a number of fields where the concept of bargaining power has proven crucial to coherent analysis, including game theory, labour economics, collective bargaining arrangements, diplomatic negotiations, settlement of litigation, the price of insurance, and any negotiation in general.

Calculation
Several formulations of bargaining power have been devised. A popular one from 1951 and due to American economist Neil W. Chamberlain is:

We may define bargaining power (of A, let us say) as being the cost to B of disagreeing on A's terms relative to the costs of agreeing on A's terms ... Stated in another way, a (relatively) high cost to B of disagreement with A means that A's bargaining power is strong. A (relatively) high cost of agreement means that A's bargaining power is weak. Such statements in themselves, however, reveal nothing of the strength or weakness of A relative to B, since B might similarly possess a strong or weak bargaining power. But if the cost to B of disagreeing on A's terms are greater than the cost of agreeing on A's terms, while the cost to A of disagreeing on B's terms is less than the cost of agreeing on B's terms, then A's bargaining power is greater than that of B. More generally, only if the difference to B between the costs of disagreement and agreement on A's terms is proportionately greater than the difference to A between the costs of disagreement and agreement on B's terms can it be said  that A's bargaining power is greater than that of B.

In another formulation, bargaining power is expressed as a ratio of a party's ability to influence the other participant, to the costs of not reaching an agreement to that party:

These formulations and more complex models with more precisely defined variables are used to predict the probability of observing a certain outcome from a range of outcomes based on the parties' characteristics and behavior before and after the negotiation.

Buying power

Buying power is a specific type of bargaining power relating to a purchaser and a supplier.  For example, a retailer may be able to dictate price to a small supplier if it has a large market share and or can bulk buy.

Economic theory
In modern economic theory, the bargaining outcome between two parties is often modeled by the Nash Bargaining solution. If the parties fail to reach an agreement, party A gets a payoff  and party B gets a payoff . If , reaching an agreement yields a larger total surplus. According to the generalized Nash bargaining solution, party A gets  and party B gets , where . There are different ways to derive . For example, Rubinstein (1982) has shown that in a bargaining game with alternating offers,  is close to  when party A is much more patient than party B, while  is equal to  if both parties are equally patient. A prominent application is the property rights approach to the theory of the firm.

See also
 Bargaining
 Collective buying power
 Inequality of bargaining power
 Intra-household bargaining
 Porter five forces analysis
 Purchasing power

References

Bargaining theory
Cooperative games